Mark Vernon is a psychotherapist and writer.

Biography
Vernon has a degree in theology from the University of Oxford and another theology degree and a physics degree from Durham University. He also has a PhD in ancient Greek philosophy from the University of Warwick.

Vernon is the author of several books on subjects from friendship and belief, to wellbeing and love, including A Secret History of Christianity: Jesus, the Last Inkling, and the Evolution of Consciousness (2019), based upon the ideas of the Oxford Inkling, Owen Barfield, and most recently, Dante's Divine Comedy: A Guide for the Spiritual Journey. He is also a research associate with Perspectiva.

He currently writes for Aeon (digital magazine), The Idler (1993), Church Times and The Tablet, as well as having written for other publications in the past. He has appeared on BBC Radio 4's In Our Time, alongside other programmes, and also regularly podcasts and posts YouTubes. Vernon was formerly a Church of England priest.

Vernon has a private psychotherapy practice and also works at the Maudsley Hospital.

Works
 Dante's Divine Comedy: A Guide for the Spiritual Journey, Angelico Press, 2021
 A Secret History of Christianity: Jesus, the Last Inkling and the Evolution of Consciousness, John Hunt Publishing: 2019
 The Idler Guide To Ancient Philosophy, Idler Books: 2015
 Carl Jung: How to believe, Guardian Shorts: 2013
 Love: All That Matters, Hodder Education: 2013
 God: The Big Questions, Quercus: 2012
 God: All That Matters, Hodder Education: 2012
 How To Be An Agnostic, Palgrave Macmillan: 2011
 The Good Life, Hodder Education: 2010
 The Meaning of Friendship, Palgrave Macmillan: 2010
 Plato’s Podcasts: The Ancients’ Guide to Modern Living, Oneworld: 2009
 Dictionary of Beliefs and Religions (Editor in Chief), Chambers Harrap: 2009
 Teach Yourself Humanism, Hodder Education: 2008
 Wellbeing, Acumen: 2008 – in The Art of Living series that he edited
 42: Deep Thought on Life, the Universe and Everything, Oneworld: 2008
 What Not To Say: Finding the Right Words at Difficult Moments, Weidenfeld and Nicolson: 2007
 Business: The Key Concepts, Routledge: 2002

References

External links

Profile at Aeon
Profile at Guardian

British broadcasters
British male journalists
English philosophers
British writers
Living people
English agnostics
English Christians
Christian philosophers
Alumni of the University of Warwick
Alumni of the University of Oxford
Alumni of Durham University
20th-century English Anglican priests
Year of birth missing (living people)